Erotinae is a subfamily of net-winged beetles in the family Lycidae. There are about 10 genera and 19 described species in Erotinae.

Genera
 Adoceta Bourgeois, 1882
 Benibotarus Kono, 1932
 Dictyoptera Latreille, 1829
 Eropterus Green, 1951
 Eros Newman, 1838
 Erotides Waterhouse, 1879
 Greenarus
 Lopheros Leconte, 1881
 Platycis Thomson, 1864
 Punicealis Kazantsev, 1990

References

 Lawrence, J. F., and A. F. Newton Jr. / Pakaluk, James, and Stanislaw Adam Slipinski, eds. (1995). "Families and subfamilies of Coleoptera (with selected genera, notes, references and data on family-group names)". Biology, Phylogeny, and Classification of Coleoptera: Papers Celebrating the 80th Birthday of Roy A. Crowson, vol. 2, 779–1006.
 Miller, Richard S. / Arnett, Ross H. Jr., Michael C. Thomas, Paul E. Skelley, and J. H. Frank, eds. (2002). "Family 59. Lycidae Laporte 1836". American Beetles, vol. 2: Polyphaga: Scarabaeoidea through Curculionoidea, 174–178.

Further reading

 Arnett, R. H. Jr., M. C. Thomas, P. E. Skelley and J. H. Frank. (eds.). (21 June 2002). American Beetles, Volume II: Polyphaga: Scarabaeoidea through Curculionoidea. CRC Press LLC, Boca Raton, Florida .
 Arnett, Ross H. (2000). American Insects: A Handbook of the Insects of America North of Mexico. CRC Press.
 Richard E. White. (1983). Peterson Field Guides: Beetles. Houghton Mifflin Company.

Lycidae